Diver or divers may refer to:

Diving (sport), the sport of performing acrobatics while jumping or falling into water
Practitioner of underwater diving, including:
scuba diving, 
freediving, 
surface-supplied diving, 
saturation diving, and
atmospheric suit diving

People
Diver (surname)
Edward Divers (1837–1912), British chemist
"Diver", nickname of Tom Derrick (1914–1945), Australian Second World War recipient of the Victoria Cross

Military
V-1 flying bomb, code named "diver" by the British World War II armed forces
Operation Diver, the British countermeasures against the German V-1 flying bomb campaign
AUM-N-4 Diver, a proposed U.S. Navy torpedo-carrying missile of the late 1940s.
Diver (United States Navy)

Arts and entertainment
Diver (EP), a 2006 EP by A Wilhelm Scream
"Diver" (Nico Touches the Walls song), a 2011 song by Nico Touches the Walls
"Diver" (Kana-Boon song), a 2015 song by Kana-Boon
Divers (album), a 2015 album by Joanna Newsom
The Diver, a 2000 sculpture by John Kaufman
The Diver (play), a play by Hideki Noda and Colin Teevan

Films 

The Diver (1911 film), a 1911 short film directed by Sidney Olcott
The Diver (2000 film), a 2000 short film directed by PV Lehtinen

Other uses
 Diver (painting), a 1962 painting by Jasper Johns
Loons, called divers in Great Britain and Ireland, a group of aquatic birds 
Diver, Ontario
"The Diver", nickname for a NBR 224 Class locomotive
Divers is a legal gender option for intersex people in Germany. See Legal recognition of non-binary gender and Legal recognition of intersex people.

See also